The Tenants of Moonbloom is a novel by the Jewish American writer Edward Lewis Wallant (1926–1962).  Wallant died of an aneurysm aged 36 with only two books published - The Human Season and The Pawnbroker.  The Tenants of Moonbloom was published posthumously.

Plot introduction
The story documents the emotional awakening of Norman Moonbloom, an isolated, apathetic man in his thirties who, having recently ended a career as 'perpetual student', is now reluctantly in the employ of his brother Irwin as a property agent.  Irwin's tenants occupy a series of dilapidated apartments in some of the poorer areas of Manhattan, and Norman's life consists of attempting to collect their rent while constantly making them empty promises about much-needed repairs.

At first, Moonbloom resolutely insulates himself against his troublesome tenants, with their incessant complaining and idiosyncratic ways.  Little by little, however, his defenses begin crumbling as they talk to him, argue with him, and impart to him their secrets and hopes. These unaccustomed intimacies bring on a seismic shift in Norman's personality, eventually inspiring him to defy his brother (who wants the apartments left exactly as they are) by undertaking all the promised repairs himself. As he goes from apartment to apartment, painting, plastering, and further immersing himself in his tenants' lives, the meek little rent collector finally comes to life.

Style and characters
The book offers a plethora of wildly diverse characters, including: a gay black jazz musician who moonlights as a gigolo; an ancient German Jew who lives alone in an unspeakably filthy apartment, drinking the days away; a pair of childless sisters who dote on their orphaned nephew, conspiring together to keep him always a child; a blowsy former Shirley Temple wannabe who divests Norman of his virginity in exchange for a rent cut; and a prim Italian linguist afflicted by a terrifying swelling in his bathroom wall.  Wallant deftly develops this gallery of characters, giving each of Moonbloom's tenants a distinct and complex personality.

Wallant has an elegant, fluid writing style, and many consider The Tenants of Moonbloom to be an exemplary piece of prose (see below link).

External links
Review of The Tenants of Moonbloom at the Guardian Books (UK)
"Grace among the roaches" – Time review of The Tenants of Moonbloom from August 16, 1963.

1963 American novels
Novels set in New York City
Harcourt (publisher) books
Novels published posthumously